Your Queen Is a Reptile is the third album by British jazz group Sons of Kemet, released in March 2018 on Impulse! Records. Band leader Shabaka Hutchings wrote and plays saxophone on all tracks, Theon Cross plays tuba, and Seb Rochford and Tom Skinner play drums. It also features toaster Congo Natty and performance poet Josh Idehen.

The album title refers to the British monarchy and the Reptilian conspiracy theory, with the sleeve notes depicting the monarchy as not representing black immigrants: "Your Queen is not our Queen / She does not see us as human". The woman to whom the first track refers, Ada Eastman, was Hutchings's great grandmother from Barbados, while the others refer to influential black women throughout history.

Your Queen Is a Reptile was nominated for the 2018 Mercury Prize. The album topped The Wire magazine's annual critics' poll and was named release of the year.

Track listing
All tracks written by Shabaka Hutchings.
"My Queen Is Ada Eastman" – 6:41
"My Queen Is Mamie Phipps Clark" – 5:31
"My Queen Is Harriet Tubman" – 5:40
"My Queen Is Anna Julia Cooper" – 5:07
"My Queen Is Angela Davis" – 6:35
"My Queen Is Nanny of the Maroons" – 6:44
"My Queen Is Yaa Asantewaa" – 7:04
"My Queen Is Albertina Sisulu" – 5:20
"My Queen Is Doreen Lawrence" – 6:52

References

2018 albums
Sons of Kemet albums
Impulse! Records albums